Programs of TeleRadyo include news, news commentary and issues, public service, public affairs, love and personal advice, entertainment and showbiz, informative, business, health and lifestyle, religious and spiritual programs. Aside from the mentioned programs, it also aired newscasts and current affairs programs from ABS-CBN on TeleRadyo, pre-empting several shows, and some original programming exclusively for TeleRadyo.

Current programs

Morning
 Kapamilya Daily Mass (2020; hook-up with Kapamilya Channel, also broadcast on TFC)
 Sakto (2014; hook-up with Kapamilya Channel, also broadcast on TFC)
 TeleRadyo Balita (2020; hook-up with Kapamilya Channel)
 Kabayan (1986–2001; 2010; hook-up with Kapamilya Channel)
 On the Spot (2017)
 Lingkod Kapamilya sa TeleRadyo (2017)

Afternoon
 Headline Pilipinas (2016)
 Playback (2021)
 Pasada sa TeleRadyo (1999)

Evening
 TV Patrol (1987; hook-up with A2Z, ANC and Kapamilya Channel)
 SRO: Suhestyon, Reaksyon at Opinyon (2010)
 ANC sa TeleRadyo (March 19 – May 15, 2020; 2021; hook-up with ANC)

Monday
 Kapamilya Konek (2013)

Tuesday
 Good Job (2019)

Thursday
 Tulong Ko, Pasa Mo (2018)

Friday
 Diskarte (2021)

Saturdays
 Kapamilya Daily Mass  (2020; hook-up with Kapamilya Channel, Jeepney TV and TFC)
 Kapamilya Journeys of Hope (2021; hook-up with Metro Channel and ANC)
 Omaga-Diaz Reports (2014)
 Your Daily Do's (2020)
 Winner Sa Life (2020)
 Bida Konsyumer (2020)
 NegoSHEnte (2022)
 TV Patrol Weekend (2004–2010; 2020; hook-up with A2Z, ANC and Kapamilya Channel) 
 ANC sa TeleRadyo (March 19 – May 15, 2020; 2021; hook-up with ANC)

Sundays
 The Healing Eucharist: Sunday TV Mass (2006; hook-up with Kapamilya Channel, Jeepney TV and TFC)
 Local Legends (2019)
 Kumustar Ka (2021; hook-up with Jeepney TV)
 KBYN: Kaagapay ng Bayan (2022; hook-up with Kapamilya Channel and A2Z)
 TV Patrol Weekend (2004–2010; 2020; hook-up with A2Z, ANC and Kapamilya Channel) 
 ANC sa TeleRadyo (March 19 – May 15, 2020; 2021; hook-up with ANC)

Religious
 Panalangin sa Alas Tres ng Hapon (hook-up with Kapamilya Channel)

News
 Balita Ngayon (1986; hourly news update)
 TeleRadyo Flash Report (up-to-the-minute breaking news)
 TeleRadyo Live (2007; special coverages)
 TeleRadyo Special Coverage (1986; special coverages)
 TeleRadyo Breaking News (2022; breaking news)

Former programs

See also 
DZMM-AM
A2Z
ABS-CBN
ANC
Kapamilya Channel
TeleRadyo

References 

ABS-CBN Corporation
DZMM